Oded Kattash (born October 10, 1974) is an Israeli professional basketball coach for  Maccabi Tel Aviv and former player. During his playing career, at a height of 194 cm (6' 4 ") tall, he played at the point guard position. He was the 1998 Israeli Basketball Premier League MVP. As a player, he won the EuroLeague title in the 1999–2000 season, while playing with Panathinaikos.

Early career
When Kattash was 9 years old, he joined the junior youth department of Maccabi Tel Aviv. He then played with Maccabi Darom, which was Maccabi Tel Aviv's farm team at the time.

Professional playing career
Kattash played with Maccabi Ramat Gan, and Hapoel Galil Elyon, before returning in 1995, to Maccabi Tel Aviv, to join their senior men's team. With Macabbi's senior team, he won 4 Israeli League championships and 2 Israeli State Cups. He was the 1998 Israeli Basketball Premier League MVP. After leading the 1997 EuroBasket in scoring, he subsequently agreed to play with the New York Knicks, but he never actually played in the NBA, because of the 1998–99 NBA season lockout, that started on July 1, 1998.

Eventually, he signed a three-year contract with Panathinaikos. In the 2000 EuroLeague Finals game, he scored 17 points, against his former team Maccabi Tel Aviv, to win the EuroLeague championship with Panathinaikos. His career ended prematurely a few months later, when he suffered a serious knee injury.

National team playing career
Kattash played at the 1997 edition of the EuroBasket, with the senior Israeli national team, scoring 22 points per game during the tournament.

Coaching career

After Kattash retired from playing basketball, he took up basketball coaching, and he first coached Hapoel Galil Elyon. He was the head coach of Macabbi Tel Aviv, from summer of 2007, until January 1, 2008, when he resigned.

Shortly after, he returned to Galil Elyon, and helped the team stay in the Israeli first division. In 2009, he remained with Galil, leading them against the odds, to the Israeli League Final Four, and coming within a last shot of knocking out Maccabi Tel Aviv in the semifinals. In 2010, he won the Israeli League championship with Galil, after a win over Maccabi Tel Aviv in the league finals.

In June 2010, Kattash was appointed as Hapoel Jerusalem's head coach, signing a three-year contract.

On June 21, 2012, Kattash was appointed the head coach of Hapoel Eilat, as the team was re-included into the Israeli Premier League, for the 2012-13 season.

On June 27, 2014, at the end of his contract, Kattash signed a three-year contract with Hapoel Tel Aviv. On November 3, 2015, he was dismissed, after only four games, after three consecutive losses. He subsequently returned to Hapoel Eilat. However, On July 18, 2017, Hapoel Eilat and Kattash decided to part ways. During that summer, Kattash led the Israel men's under-20 national team to a silver medal at the 2017 FIBA Europe Under-20 Championship.

On October 10, 2017, The Basketball Federation of Israel, named Kattash the new head coach of the senior Israeli national team, for the next four years.

On February 22, 2018, Kattash returned for a second stint to Hapoel Jerusalem, signing a one-and-a-half year deal.

On January 14, 2021, Kattash signed a one-and-a-half year deal with Panathinaikos of the Greek Basket League and the EuroLeague.

Coaching record

EuroLeague

|- 
| align="left"|Maccabi Tel Aviv
| align="left"|2007–08
| 9 || 6 || 3 ||  || align="center"|Resigned
|- 
| align="left"|Panathinaikos
| align="left"|2020–21
| 16 || 5 || 11 ||  || align="center"|Eliminated in the regular season
|- 
|-class="sortbottom"
| align="center" colspan=2|Career||25||11||14||||

Personal life
Kattash is of Algerian descent.
Kattash is known to have different-coloured irises, a condition known as heterochromia of the irises (heterochromia iridis).
Kattash is a good friend with the former player and current coach Dror Cohen. They have a long history of playing and coaching together.

See also

List of select Jewish basketball players

References

External links

FIBA Profile
FIBA Europe Profile
Article about Kattash
 Kattash and Knicks
News piece about coaching Maccabi

1974 births
Living people
Hapoel Galil Elyon players
Ironi Ramat Gan players
Israeli basketball coaches
Israeli men's basketball players
Israeli Basketball Premier League players
Israeli expatriate basketball people in Greece
Israeli Jews
Jewish men's basketball players
Maccabi Tel Aviv B.C. players
Panathinaikos B.C. players
Panathinaikos B.C. coaches
Sportspeople from Givatayim
Point guards
Israeli people of Egyptian-Jewish descent
Israeli people of Algerian-Jewish descent